Appa Rao or Apparao may refer to:

 Gurajada Apparao (1862–1915), Telugu poet and writer
 Meka Rangaiah Appa Rao (1915–2003), Indian politician
 Appa Rao Podile (born 1960), Indian scientist and educator
 Apparao M. Rao (fl. 2006–2016), Indian born physicist

See also
 
 
 

Indian given names